Luis Antonio Valdéz Salas (born 1 July 1965) is a Mexican former footballer who played at both professional and international levels as a striker. He is nicknamed  El cadáver  (The corpse).

Valdéz, who played club football for Chivas, Monterrey and León, represented the Mexico national team at the 1994 FIFA World Cup.

References

External links
FIFA profile

1967 births
Living people
Mexico international footballers
Footballers from Aguascalientes
1994 FIFA World Cup players
C.D. Guadalajara footballers
C.F. Monterrey players
Club León footballers
Mexican footballers
Association football midfielders
Liga MX players